The Shawnee Hawks were a minor league baseball team that played in the Sooner State League. The team began as an unaffiliated team based in Duncan, Oklahoma in 1947. The original team was named the Duncan Cementers.

After two seasons, the team name was changed to the Duncan Uttmen in 1949 and then in 1950 the team moved to Shawnee, Oklahoma and became the Hawks. They continued to operate until the Sooner State League folded after the 1957 season.

The Hawks were affiliated with the Brooklyn Dodgers from 1953–1957.

External links
Baseball Reference
Historical chart of the Sooner State League

Defunct minor league baseball teams
Brooklyn Dodgers minor league affiliates
Professional baseball teams in Oklahoma
Baseball teams established in 1947
Baseball teams disestablished in 1957
1947 establishments in Oklahoma
1957 disestablishments in Oklahoma
Stephens County, Oklahoma
Defunct baseball teams in Oklahoma